Madame de Beaumer (1720-1766), was a French feminist, journalist and editor.  She was the director of the women's magazine Journal des dames (1759–78) in 1761-1763.

The name and private life of Madame de Beaumer is mainly unknown, but she was reportedly from the Netherlands. In 1761, she bought the royalist Journal des Dames and transformed it from a harmless women's magazine to a radical feminist magazine. 

She was famous for her radical feminist ideas, and the first female editor in France to publicly argue for education and a professional and independent life for women in her own magazine. She was regarded as very radical, and used confrontational language in her writing. She sold the paper to Catherine Michelle de Maisonneuve in 1763.

See also
 List of women printers and publishers before 1800

References

1720 births
1766 deaths
18th-century French women writers
18th-century French journalists
18th-century French newspaper publishers (people)
French feminists
18th-century French businesswomen
18th-century women journalists